Vincenzo Chimirri (born 7 December 1973) is an Italian equestrian. He competed in two events at the 2004 Summer Olympics.

References

External links
 

1973 births
Living people
Italian male equestrians
Olympic equestrians of Italy
Equestrians at the 2004 Summer Olympics
People from Catanzaro
Equestrians of Fiamme Oro
Sportspeople from the Province of Catanzaro